The Devil's Staircase Wilderness is a forested wilderness area adjacent to the Umpqua River in the Southern Oregon Coast Range of the U.S. state of Oregon.  It was officially designated in March 2019.

The wilderness is one of a handful of federally protected old-growth forest stands in the Oregon Coast Range, others being the Drift Creek Wilderness, the Rock Creek Wilderness, and the Cummins Creek Wilderness, all of which were established in 1984.

References

External links 

Wilderness areas of Oregon
Protected areas of Douglas County, Oregon
2019 establishments in Oregon
Protected areas established in 2019